Edwin Henry Berrington (20 April 1850 – 11 May 1880) was an English cricketer. He played one first-class match for Surrey in 1872.

See also
 List of Surrey County Cricket Club players

References

External links
 

1850 births
1880 deaths
English cricketers
Surrey cricketers
Cricketers from Greater London